Jan Friis-Mikkelsen (born 26 February 1963) is a Danish chef and restaurateur. He was also judge on DR1's Den Store Bagedyst, the Danish version of The Great British Bake Off.

Career
Jan Friis Mikkelsen was born in the Frederiksberg district of Copenhagen. He trained as a chef in France. In 1987, he opened Restaurant Tinggården in Asserbo outside Frederiksværk. The restaurant is based in a three-winged farmhouse from 1702.

Friis-Mikkelsen first appeared on television as Claus Meyer's co-host in the DR1 cooking show Meyers Køkken ("Meyer's Cuisine") in the 1990s. In 2012-2016 he has appeared as judge alongside Mette Blomsterberg on Den Store Bagedyst.

He is also involved in the production of cherry wines on the Frederiksdal Estate on Lolland.

Written works
 Desserter
 Caféretter
 Grill fra panden
 Jans Kogebog (2004)

References

External links
 Restaurant Tinggården
 Frederiksdal cherry wine

Danish chefs
Danish restaurateurs
People from Frederiksberg Municipality
1963 births
Living people